Emin Halid Onat (December 20, 1908 – July 17, 1961) was a Turkish architect and former rector of Istanbul Technical University.

Onat was born in Istanbul in 1908. He entered Istanbul Technical University in 1926. Then, he was sent to Zurich Technical University. Onat was one of the architects of Anıtkabir, the mausoleum of Mustafa Kemal Atatürk. His architectural style was formed at ETH. Emin Onat learned to experiment, interpret and search for modernism from his teacher Otto R. Salvisberg, a well-known, experienced practicing architect. Despite getting under the Anıtkabir's shadow, he has a unique architectural style.

Career
Onat's architectural talent blossomed at Zurich Technical University, where one of his fellow students was Otto Rudolf Salvisberg, who later went to become one of the best architects of his time. Onat completed his studies in Zurich and returned to Turkey in 1934. Within a year, he had become an assistant professor in the Department of Architecture at the School of Engineering. He held the post for a couple of years that were marked by strenuous relations with the other members of the faculty, owing to the novel methods of teaching Onat introduced. In 1944 Onat became the first dean of the newly established Faculty of Architecture at the Istanbul Technical University.

Onat rose further into the echelons of the architectural world in 1946, when he was given an honorary membership of the Royal Institute of British Architects (RIBA). In 1951 he became the Rector of the Istanbul Technical University, a post he held for two years. The Hannover Technical University awarded him an honorary doctorate in 1956. In 1957 he returned to the university. His return lasted only three years as on 21 October 1960 he and 147 faculty members were ousted from the university.

Designs
Onat designed several impressive buildings during his career. These include the Istanbul Theatre and Conservatory, Istanbul Justice Palace (1949), Kavaklıdere Cenap, Presidential Secretariat in Cankaya and the General Directorate of Security. Onat had a predilection for local architectural elements. He fused traditional designs into his own designs, striving to attain organic unity. Onat's other designs are the Istanbul Lounges, Uludag Sanatorium, Bursa Governor's Mansion and IBM Headquarters in Istanbul.

Works
His professional life can be divided three periods:

 Functionalism with Bauhaus style; he mostly made competition projects
 İstanbul Tiyatro ve Konservatuarı, 1935, Istanbul
 İstanbul Galata Ferri Station and Passenger Hall, 1936, Istanbul
There is a very clear functional order and careful search for monumantallity.

 Halik Zigal House, 1941-1942, Istanbul

The last example of his early modern designs. It has two storeys and a simple, prismatic look. Functional order and horizontal emphasis are a sign of modernism.

 Classism with traditional interpretation and nostalgia; he was searching for reference at this years. Onat's approach at this era mostly concentrate on interpreting rationalism in Anatolian housing architecture. In this period his most significant works are Village Institutes and Anıtkabir
 Kepirtepe Village Institutes, 1941-1942, Kırklareli
 
These are established with special lows. This projects must be simple, rational, functional and applicable, like model projects. Except the structural parts whole building built by villagers and students. The complex building contains 44 functional buildings.

 Istanbul Faculty of Science and Literature, 1942-1952, Istanbul
 
It constructed onside of Zeyneb Hanım Mansion. It designs as a complex that enclose a courtyard. This courtyard bring a classical look in plans so Emin Onat used double or triple height holes and passages with a colonnade. This building show up the architects' historical trends of period. At the other side it shows a functionalist approach and the high technology usage.

 Emin Onat House (1944), Moda, Kadıköy, Istanbul 
 
It is a single storey building with a high basement. This house is an example of 1940s historical trends and Anatolian architecture understanding. Timber balcony, gable roof, narrow overhangs and the timber windows are the typical elements of that. Interior has very modernist plan. At south façade the sleeping facilities are located and the service spaces are located at north façade.
 
 Vali House, 1945, Bursa

It has a courtyard /core in the shape of square, the courtyard emphasis with a pool and the common spaces are located around the pool like living room, rest room, tea room. Sleeping facilities are located outside the square frame that open to terrace garden. The timber elements are typical with Onat.

 Cenap And House, 1952, Ankara

As of 2014 it was being used as a Music Museum. It is a two-storey building, built out of local masonry, It has elements that come from Anatolian architecture for example "çıkma motifi" window proportions and overhangs. Despite of its local look, it has a very modern plan

Onat used Anatolian elements at exterior and his buildings have traditional looks but they have modern and functional interior plans.

 Anıtkabir, 1942-1953, Rasattepe in Ankara (with Orhan Arda)

Anıtkabir's design refers to antique mausoleums, so it provokes much discussion. Most significant and important characteristic of Anıtkabir is that compatible with Rasartepe's topography. It has an horizontal silhouette. It has two perpendicular axis and it opens to city from four way. It has a bond with city and this bond make design unique for place, but the monumental look of it distinguish Anıtkabir from city. Monumentalizing the design makes it a conceptual object. Anıtkabir visualize its symbolism even in its ornaments.

 Return to the modernism
 Kirazlıyayla Prevatoryumu Bursa, 1946

Prevatorium was a great center for members of Ministry of National Education placed in the forest. Onat created little touches for the necessities of health function. For instance, rations of the atrium in the building.

 Yapı Kredi Bankası Bursa, 1946

It was a space that have rectangular mass and a mixture of historical elements. Also structural axes have large and long window openings, especially the upside of windows have cross lines. Finally, a large canopy was placed outside of the building.

 Istanbul Adalet Sarayı, 1951-1955, Istanbul

After the fire of the old place authorize prepared a competition twice. The first time they did not accept any project.But the second time M. Emin Onat and Sedad Hakkı Eldem won it.
Building was built the west side of the most important part of Istanbul. Moreover, there was a huge argument happened because of the government rules and for protecting the area.
justice Palace was functional building, court's units sorted rhythmical and connect into a large corridor.

 T.C Cumhurbaşkanlığı Genel Sekreterlik Binası, Ankara, 1953

The building belongs to transition period of Emin Onat's style. It occurred from long rectangular form and double-height also so pure design in the facade with this feature it gains a speciality at that period's building. The building's entrance is on the long edge of the rectangle and defined with a square canopy. That was really important at that time. The building has been demolished.

 Emniyet Sarayı, Ankara, Hipodrom, 1956

Firstly the complex had much program but only the office side was built. The main building has 14 floors the other supporting building has three. Main building have a high prismatic mass. These features it had international style. In addition, there was a harmony of architectural things for instance the geometrical balance between balconies and windows.

 Maliye Evleri, 1953-1961 Ankara, Seyranbağları

First of all it was a social building.
Maybe this apartment blocks the most unknown project of Emin Onat however it was the most interesting one.He effected from Le Corbusier’s ‘Unite d’Habitation’. The building occurred from three units on the same street. It separated from period of time with located on the horizontal mass of ladder plastics and circulation corridor connecting the balconies.

 Hayat Yapı Kooperatifleri Evleri, 1953-1961

The rising prismatic mass resembles the Le Corbusier style. His design has functionality of using common area.
Unfortunately, the facade has deteriorated.

 Marmara Apartmanı (1957) Moda, Kadıköy, Istanbul

Primarily, it was a housing building that located in the seacoast. The building features five storeys, concrete, reflected international style, has two blocks and is modern. Large window openings can simplify to get more view of the sea. Also the vertical elements are the most dominant part of the building.

 Yüksel Apartmanı, 1960 Istanbul, Şişli

Project was a new trying of housing buildings. He solved the problem of project’s topography and city’s connection bravely but this project was never built.

 Ankara Zafer Meydanı, 1959-1961 Ankara

In early period of Ankara it was a modern and simple building but today it become a bazaar and lost.

 Moda Marine Club, Moda, Kadıköy, Istanbul

Onat spent more effort in that social building. It functions as a beach hotel, disco, sail, club, etc. It was the closest building to Onat’s teacher at Zurich ‘Otto Salvisberg’s modernist school. Unfortunately, a small part of the complex was built then highly modified.

 Devres İşhanı, 1961 Istanbul, Gumussuyu

Devres was the last project of Emin Onat. The building differed from similar examples at that time with its high entrance and using the sloping area also to have square floor plans and has six floors. Finally it was a perfect example of international modernist style of Turkey.

References

External links 
Emin Onat: Biography
Emin Onat: Architecture

Istanbul Technical University alumni
Academic staff of Istanbul Technical University
1908 births
1961 deaths
ETH Zurich alumni
Rectors of Istanbul Technical University
Recipients of TÜBİTAK Service Award
20th-century Turkish architects